The hierarchy of the sciences is a theory formulated by Auguste Comte in the 19th century. This theory states that science develops over time beginning with the simplest and most general scientific discipline, astronomy, which is the first to reach the "positive stage" (one of three in Comte's law of three stages). As one moves up the "hierarchy", this theory further states that sciences become more complex and less general, and that they will reach the positive stage later. Disciplines further up the hierarchy are said to depend more on the developments of their predecessors; the highest discipline on the hierarchy are the social sciences. According to this theory, there are higher levels of consensus and faster rates of advancement in physics and other natural sciences than there are in the social sciences.

Evidence
Research has shown that, after controlling for the number of hypotheses being tested, positive results are 2.3 times more likely in the social sciences than in the physical sciences. It has also been found that the degree of scientific consensus is highest in the physical sciences, lowest in the social sciences, and intermediate in the biological sciences. Dean Simonton argues that a composite measure of the scientific status of disciplines ranks psychology much closer to biology than to sociology.

References

Philosophical theories
Auguste Comte
Philosophy of science